Bayanga is a town and sub-prefecture of Sangha-Mbaéré in the Central African Republic. It is one of the few tourist destinations in the country.

It is located in the tropical rainforest zone in the Dzanga-Sangha Dense Forest Special Reserve and 10 km from the Dzanga-Ndoki National Park.

The town itself had a population of around 4,000 people in 2003, while the entire sub-prefecture of the same name was home to around 9,800 people. The sub-prefecture has one commune: Yobe-Sangha.

History  
Bayanga was originally a Sangha-Sangha fishing village home to around 200 people, in the middle of the tropical rainforest populated by the Baka people, sometimes referred to by outsiders as "pygmies" due to their short stature. In the 1970s, a sawmill was constructed and over the next decade, Bayanga grew into somewhat of a boomtown with the arrival of the logging industry. This also saw the arrival of Lebanese shopkeepers, Western missionaries, discotheques and even loan sharks.

In 1988, the Central African Government and WWF  committed to the establishment and management of a protected area system in the region.  This is the beginning of the Dzanga-Sangha Project (PDS).  This will lead in 1990 to the creation of the Dzanga-Ndoki National Park (1150 km2) and the Dzanga-Sangha Dense Forest Special Reserve (3200 km2) for multiple use.

With the creation of the Dzanga-Sangha Protected Area System (APDS) and the construction of a hotel in 1996, the foundations for the development of ecotourism activities capable of attracting an international clientele should be brought together.

In 2004, the sawmill employed around 400 people, many of them migrants from other parts of the country. Meanwhile, the reserve employed around 200 people.

Civil war 
On 10 March 2014 Bayanga subprefecture was captured by Anti-balaka militias following Seleka withdrawal. Many people, particularly migrants who worked in and around the logging industry, fled. The town was recaptured by government forces in late May.

References 

Sub-prefectures of the Central African Republic
Populated places in the Central African Republic